Alestopetersius tumbensis is a species of African tetras found in the Malebo Pool, the Kwenge River of the Kwilu River drainage and Lake Tumba in the Democratic Republic of the Congo.

References

Paugy, D., 1984. Characidae. p. 140-183. In J. Daget, J.-P. Gosse and D.F.E. Thys van den Audenaerde (eds.) Check-list of the freshwater fishes of Africa (CLOFFA). ORSTOM, Paris and MRAC, Tervuren. Vol. 1.

Alestidae
Fish of Africa
Taxa named by Jacobus Johannes Hoedeman
Fish described in 1951